Aatma Bandhuvulu ( Soul Relatives) is a 1987 Telugu-language drama film, produced and directed by Dasari Narayana Rao under the Taraka Prabhu Films banner. It stars Akkineni Nageswara Rao, Jayasudha  and music composed by Chandra Shekar. The film is a remake of the Hindi movie Amrit (1986). Akkineni Nageswara Rao won the Filmfare Award for Best Actor - Telugu for this film.

Plot
The story revolves around two elderly people Anand Rao (Akkineni Nageswara Rao) & Kalyani (Jayasudha) a widow & widower, who shares bondage beyond relations. Both of them are ill-treated by their children. The only one loves them is their respective grandchildren Rajesh & Alekhya. As their selfish children suspect their relation they leave the town and decide to spend the rest part of life together irrespective of societal acceptance. After 20 years Rajesh (Rajesh) & Alekhya (Poornima) get married and castigate their parents as equivalent. Finally, the movie ends a happy note by Rajesh & Alyekya reaching their grandparents.

Cast
Akkineni Nageswara Rao as Ananda Rao
Jayasudha as Kalyani
Dasari Narayana Rao
Murali Mohan
Sudhakar
Prasad Babu
Rajesh as Rajesh
Raadhika
Suryakantam
Rajyalakshmi
Prabha
Poornima as Alekya
Anuradha

Soundtrack 

Music composed by Chandra Shekar. Music released on Lahari Music Company.

References

External links

Indian drama films
Telugu remakes of Hindi films
Films directed by Dasari Narayana Rao
1980s Telugu-language films
1987 drama films
1987 films